Count George Pavlovich Ignatieff,  (December 16, 1913 – August 10, 1989) was a Canadian diplomat. His career spanned nearly five decades in World War II and the postwar period.

Early life and education

Count Ignatieff was born in Saint Petersburg, Russian Empire, the youngest of five sons, to a distinguished Russian noble family. His mother was Princess Natalia Nikolayevna Meshcherskaya and his father was Count Pavel Ignatiev, a close advisor to Tsar Nicholas II serving as his last Minister of Education. In 1918, the year after the Russian Revolution, Count Ignatieff was imprisoned, but his release was negotiated by sympathetic supporters.  The family fled to France, and later moved to Canada. George Ignatieff was educated at St Paul's School, London, Lower Canada College, and the University of Trinity College, University of Toronto, before being awarded a Rhodes Scholarship to study at Oxford.

Wartime service and postwar diplomacy

With the advent of war, Ignatieff joined the Royal Artillery, where he worked in photographic intelligence. In 1940 he joined the Canadian Department of External Affairs.  He became personal assistant to the Canadian High Commissioner in London, Vincent Massey, and during his London posting began a friendship with Lester Pearson, later Prime Minister of Canada.  Ignatieff also served as the wartime Canadian delegate to the International Red Cross.

Ignatieff was a key figure in Canadian diplomacy and international relations through the postwar period.  He was Ambassador to Yugoslavia (1956–1958), permanent representative to NATO (1963–1966), Canadian Ambassador to the United Nations (1966–1969) and president of the United Nations Security Council (1968–1969). In 1984 Ignatieff was appointed Ambassador for Disarmament by Prime Minister John Turner.

Ignatieff was unimpressed by the foreign policy of the Trudeau governments of the 1970s and 1980s, and was unafraid to provoke government functionaries.  He advocated cautious realignment of Canadian defence policy, and a complete nuclear test ban.  Like his mentor Pearson, Ignatieff believed in the interdependence of nations, and had an acute prescience for the impending threats of terror, economic breakdown, and environmental degradation.

Ignatieff served as Provost of the University of Trinity College from 1972 to 1979, and later as chancellor of the University of Toronto from 1980 to 1986. The University of Trinity College's theatre is named after Ignatieff, and is fondly known as the GIT (pronounced 'jit').

George Ignatieff has been described as the "best Governor General (Canada) never had".    His autobiography, The Making of a Peacemonger, was published in 1985 by the University of Toronto Press.

Personal life

Ignatieff married Alison Grant (the granddaughter of George Monro Grant and niece of Vincent Massey) in 1944, and had two sons.  The elder, Michael Ignatieff, was Leader of the Liberal Party of Canada and Leader of the Official Opposition from 2008 to 2011. Andrew Ignatieff was a community worker and assisted in his brother's leadership campaign.

Awards and honorary degrees

Ignatieff was made a Companion of the Order of Canada in 1973.  He received the Pearson Medal of Peace for his work in international service in 1984.  He received eight Honorary Degrees from Canadian universities.

  Brock University in St. Catharines, Ontario  (LL.D)  on May 27, 1969
 University of Saskatchewan in Saskatoon, Saskatchewan (LL.D) on May 18, 1973
  York University in Toronto, Ontario  (LL.D) Fall 1975
  Mount Allison University in Sackville, New Brunswick  (LL.D) in 1978
  University of Victoria  in Victoria, British Columbia (LL.D) in June 1984
  Trent University in Peterborough, Ontario  (LL.D) in Fall 1984

References

External links
 
 Pearson Medal of Peace - George Ignatieff
 
George Ignatieff oral history interview held at the University of Toronto Archives and Records Management Services

1913 births
1989 deaths
Canadian Rhodes Scholars
Chancellors of the University of Toronto
Companions of the Order of Canada
Counts of the Russian Empire
Permanent Representatives of Canada to NATO
Permanent Representatives of Canada to the United Nations
Nobility from Saint Petersburg
Trinity College (Canada) alumni
University of Toronto alumni
Ambassadors of Canada to Yugoslavia
Deaths from Alzheimer's disease
Neurological disease deaths in Ontario
White Russian emigrants to Canada
Emigrants from the Russian Empire to Canada
British Army personnel of World War II
Royal Artillery officers
People educated at St Paul's School, London